Portrait of a Young Man in Armor is a  oil painting on canvas by Peter Paul Rubens. it his held at the Timken Museum of Art, in San Diego.

References

1620 paintings
Paintings by Peter Paul Rubens
Paintings in the collection of the Timken Museum of Art
Paintings of people